The Ngadju are an Aboriginal Australian people of the Goldfields-Esperance region of the Western Australia.

Country
The last named area was land they claim in contention with the Nyunga branch of the Wudjari. Their western borders were around Fraser Range. The eastern frontier was in the vicinity of Narethal and Point Culver. Mount Andrew and Balladonia were also part of Ngadju territory.

In 2014 and 2017 the Federal Court recognized Ngadju traditional ownership of over 102,000 square kilometres, after a long legal proceeding which began in 1995. The land includes exclusive native title over approximately 45,000 square kilometres, east and west of the town of Norseman.

In 2020 the Ngadju Indigenous Protected Area was dedicated on Ngadju land. The Ngadju serve as traditional custodians of the area, which covers 43,993.01 km2, about a quarter of the Great Western Woodlands.

The Ngadju Rangers combine traditional land management and contemporary science to conserve biodiversity, manage fire, weeds, and feral animals, and protect cultural sites within the protected area.

Curiosity
Richard Helms, in his account of the Elders Expedition, writes of a case of polydactyly he came across among a people of this region:-
A remarkable lusus naturae was observed among the women of the Frazer Range, one of whom had six perfect fingers on each hand and the same number of toes on each foot. Not only were these limbs perfectly formed, but the corresponding metacarpal and metatarsal bones were also perfect. Two of her brothers and a sister had, I was told, exactly the same deformity.

Norman Tindale identified the tribe here as the Ngadjunmaia.

Alternative names
 Ngadjunpakara, Ngadjunpukara.
 Ngadjunma
 Ngadju: (nadan is their word for yes)
 Ba:donjunga ( a Wudjari exonym referring to subincised men
 Bardok. ('subincised')
 Pardoak (Wiilman exonym).
 Ngadjumaja.(of Njunga tribe to south)
 Malba. (southernj tribal name, meaning 'the circumcised') for their language, and also those of the Kalaako and Kalamaia)
 Fraser Range tribe.
 Minninng.
 West Meening, West Mining.
 Buljigu. (name of a dialect spoken by northern bands).

References

Sources

Aboriginal peoples of Western Australia